A rock crystal vase is a vase made of rock crystal, a type of hardstone carving. Such vases were rare, expensive, and decorated with gold and jewels, used by royalty in Europe.

A rock crystal vase {fr} that probably originated in the seventh century was given to Duke William IX of Aquitaine (the Troubadour) by a Muslim ally (probably Abd al-Malik Imad ad-Dawla). When Duchess Eleanor of Aquitaine, William IX's granddaughter, married King Louis VII of France in 1137, she gave him the rock crystal vase as a wedding present.  The inscription on it says he, in turn, gave it to the Abbey of St.-Denis.  It is now in the Louvre in Paris and is the only artifact of Eleanor's known to exist today.

Another was a crystal and gold posset that the Spanish ambassador gave Queen Mary I of England and Philip of Spain as a betrothal gift.  It was made by Benvenuto Cellini and the whole set is now on display at Hatfield House in England.

Notes

External links

The Eleanor Vase Images of Medieval Art and Architecture

Hardstone carving